Rune Herregodts (born 27 July 1998) is a Belgian racing cyclist, who currently rides for UCI WorldTeam .

Major results
2016
 4th Overall Sint-Martinusprijs Kontich
2018
 2nd Dorpenomloop Rucphen
2019
 1st  Individual pursuit, National Track Championships
2020
 1st Paris–Tours Espoirs
2021
 1st Ronde van Drenthe
 3rd Trofeo Calvia
 5th Trofeo Andratx – Mirador d’Es Colomer
 6th Münsterland Giro
 6th Chrono des Nations
2022
 1st Stage 1 Vuelta a Andalucía
 1st Stage 1 Sazka Tour
 4th Time trial, National Road Championships
 4th Brussels Cycling Classic
 10th Overall Tour de Luxembourg
2023
 2nd Figueira Champions Classic

References

External links

1998 births
Living people
Belgian male cyclists
Sportspeople from Aalst, Belgium
Cyclists from East Flanders
21st-century Belgian people